Tatobity is a municipality and village in Semily District in the Liberec Region of the Czech Republic. It has about 600 inhabitants.

Administrative parts
The village of Žlábek is an administrative part of Tatobity.

Sights

According to the municipal website, the most valuable sight in Tatobity is the "Tatobity Millennial Linden" with an estimated age between 600–1,000 years.

The most valuable building is the Church of Saint Lawrence, built in 1714–1753.

References

Villages in Semily District